Tritle Peak is an  prominence adjacent Roosevelt Point, on the East Rim of the Walhalla Plateau (East Kaibab Plateau). It is located in far eastern Grand Canyon, of Northern Arizona. The entire ridge is a bright dark-burnt-red from the Hermit Shale, and sits on a ridgeline-platform of Supai Group unit 4, the Esplanade Sandstone.

Tritle Peak is at the headwaters of two major drainages east to the south-flowing Colorado River, next to the East Rim, Grand Canyon – Upper Nankoweap Creek drainage (north), and Upper Kwagunt Creek drainage (south).

Geology (ridgeline of Esplanade Sandstone)

In the region adjacent to the East Rim of the Walhalla Plateau (Kaibab Plateau), at rock units of the upper Supai Group, the platforms of the Esplanade Sandstone support various landforms. They are namely - Mount Hayden, Brady Peak, and Tritle Peak. The peaks are composed of eroded Coconino Sandstone, upon Hermit Shale, (slope-formed) slopes, debris-filled or vegetated. Ridgelines with no remaining Coconino Sandstone peaks, will be dk-reddish, or red from the Supai Group (with 2 cliff-layers & 2 slope-layers). Numerous ridgelines along the Walhalla Plateau East Rim have shed this Coconino Sandstone.

References

External links

 Tritle Peak closeup
 View of Roosevelt (and 2 Kaibab Limestone Rim prominences), and view of Tritle Peak below Rim. (Click on photo)

Grand Canyon
Landforms of Coconino County, Arizona